Limekiller may refer to:

¡Limekiller! (collection), a collection of short stories about Avram Davidson's character Jack Limekiller
Charles Limekiller, a minor character in Berkeley Breathed's comic strip Bloom County
Lola Limekiller, a minor character in Berkeley Breathed's comic strip Bloom County